Joanne Baron (born February 3, 1953) is an American actress and Meisner technique acting coach. She was raised in Providence, Rhode Island and attended Classical and Pawtucket High Schools. She received early acceptance to the University of Connecticut, then pursued Broadway opportunities and sang in Reno Sweeny's with Cissy Houston, Whitney Houston's mother.

Actress, producer
Baron's film acting credits include Valley Girl, National Lampoon's Joy of Sex, Real Genius, Introducing Dorothy Dandridge, Drag Me to Hell, Spider-Man 2, The Prince & Me, Allie & Me, Universal Soldier, Someone to Watch Over Me. Television appearances include roles on the Emmy award winning television show Mad Men, Law & Order, The Shield, Curb Your Enthusiasm, and the ABC series Lovers and Other Strangers. She acted as executive producer for the TV movie Profoundly Normal starring Kirstie Alley and as producer on the films Perfume, Brooklyn Babylon, and Allie & Me, for which she won Best Actress at the River Run Film Festival.  Joanne also has extensive stage credits including There Once Was a Girl from Pawtucket staged in Los Angeles and which received two Dramalogue Awards in 1997.

Meisner Technique master teacher
Baron is known for her dedication to the work of Sanford Meisner and is a teacher of the Meisner technique. She trained with Neighborhood Playhouse alum and master Meisner teacher, William Esper, who founded the MFA and BFA Professional Actor Training Programs at Rutgers University. Her past students include Halle Berry, Robin Wright, Mariska Hargitay, Patrick Dempsey, Leslie Mann, and directors Martha Coolidge and Tom Shadyac.

Joanne Baron / D.W. Brown Acting Studio
For over 20 years, Baron has been co-owner and artistic director of the Joanne Baron / DW Brown Studio in Santa Monica, California, (an offshoot of The William Esper Studio in New York) with her husband, actor, acting coach and director, D.W. Brown. Former students include Luca Bercovici, Ekin Tunçay Turan, Leslie Mann, Channon Roe, Haley Webb, and Robin Wright.

Filmography

Film

Television

References

External links 
 
 Baron Brown Studio

American film actresses
American acting coaches
1953 births
Living people
Actors from Providence, Rhode Island
University of Connecticut alumni
Place of birth missing (living people)
20th-century American actresses
American television actresses
American stage actresses
Actresses from Rhode Island
21st-century American women